Campbellford District High School is a high school in the community of Campbellford in the municipality of Trent Hills, Northumberland County, Ontario, Canada.  It is part of the Kawartha Pine Ridge District School Board.  it had 709 students. In the Fraser Institute's Report Card on Ontario's Secondary Schools 2011, the school was ranked 432 out of 727 secondary schools in Ontario with an overall rating of 5.8 out of 10.

See also
List of high schools in Ontario

References

External links

School page at the Kawartha Pine Ridge District School Board

High schools in Northumberland County, Ontario
Educational institutions in Canada with year of establishment missing